Nueve Reinas is a 2000 Argentinian crime film written and directed by Fabián Bielinsky. It stars Ricardo Darín, Gastón Pauls, and Leticia Brédice. In the film, con artists Marcos (Darín) and Juan (Pauls) unexpectedly team up to sell counterfeit rare stamps to a wealthy foreign collector.

Nueve Reinas was theatrically released in Argentina on August 31, 2000, by Buena Vista International. The film received praise for its screenplay, Bielinsky's direction, acting performances, and its tone; it is considered an Argentine film classic. Nueve Reinas was a commercial success, grossing $12.4 million worldwide.

In 2022, it was selected as the 10th greatest film of Argentine cinema in a poll organized in 2022 by the specialized magazines La vida útil, Taipei and La tierra quema, which was presented at the Mar del Plata International Film Festival. Also in 2022, the film was included in Spanish magazine Fotogramass list of the 20 best Argentine films of all time.

Plot
In the early hours, con artist Juan successfully scams a cashier at a convenience store, and is apprehended by the staff as he attempts the same scam on a different cashier. Fellow con artist Marcos feigns being a police officer and takes Juan away from the store. Marcos requests Juan be his partner for the day, saying his has recently disappeared. Although reluctant, Juan agrees because his father, also a con man, is in jail and requires $70,000 to bribe a judge at his hearing.

Later that day, the pair are presented an elaborate and lucrative scheme when Sandler, Marcos' elderly former associate, contacts him to help sell the "Nine Queens", a counterfeit sheet of rare stamps, to Vidal Gandolfo, a wealthy Spanish collector staying at the hotel where Marcos' sister, Valeria, works. Vidal will be deported from Argentina the following day due to corruption charges.

Vidal meets with Marcos and Juan. Lacking sufficient time to properly authenticate the stamps, Vidal hires an expert who confirms their validity. Vidal offers $450,000 for the stamps, with the exchange to take place that evening. Outside the hotel, the expert tells Marcos and Juan he knew the stamps were forged and demands a bribe. The fake stamps are then stolen out of Juan and Marcos' hands by thieves on a motorcycle who, unaware of their value, toss them into a river.

To salvage the scheme, Marcos and Juan approach Sandler's widowed sister Berta; her deceased husband owned the real stamps. She agrees to sell for $250,000. Marcos says he can put up $200,000 and asks Juan to contribute the remaining $50,000, but Juan becomes suspicious of Marcos since it is the exact amount of money he so far has saved. After visiting his father in jail, he ultimately agrees to the arrangement and the pair buy the real stamps.

Marcos and Juan return to the hotel to meet Vidal. After finding out Valeria is Marcos' sister, Vidal says he will now only buy the stamps if he is able to have sex with Valeria. Valeria agrees, and says her price for doing so is for Marcos to confess to their younger brother, Federico, that Marcos cheated both Valeria and Federico out of their family inheritance. After he does so, Valeria spends the night with Vidal.

The next morning, Valeria informs them that Vidal paid for the stamps with a certified check. On their way to the bank, an attempted mugging is revealed to be an attempted con by Marcos to cheat Juan out of his share; Juan reveals he hid the check and will hand it to Marcos as they reach the bank. Upon arrival, they see a crowd outside and learn the bank has failed due to fraud by the management, making the check worthless. Juan, looking disillusioned, walks away, while Marcos sticks around to see if he can find a way to still get the money.

Juan arrives at a warehouse, where he greets the motorcycle thieves, Vidal, Sandler, Berta, and Valeria, who is Juan's girlfriend – revealing that the real con was to swindle Marcos out of $200,000, as revenge for all the times he cheated his family and his partners.

Cast 
 Ricardo Darín as Marcos  An experienced con artist who leads a scam against Vidal Gandolfo with Juan.
 Gastón Pauls as Juan  A con artist who unexpectedly partners with Marcos.
 Leticia Brédice as Valeria  Marcos and Federico's sister and a hotel employee who is embroiled in a legal battle against Marcos for rights to their family inheritance.

The cast is rounded out with Ignasi Abadal as Vidal Gandolfo, a rich, corrupt Spanish stamp collector. Tomás Fonzi portrays Federico, Marcos and Valeria's younger brother. Oscar Núñez and Celia Juárez portray Sandler and Mrs. Sandler, respectively, while Elsa Berenguer appears as Berta, Sandler's sister. Antonio Ugo, Jorge Noya, Alejandro Awada, Ricardo Díaz Mourelle, and Roberto Rey portray D'Agostino, Anibal, Washington, and Texan, and Ramiro, all local conmen who have worked with Marcos. Leo Dyzen appears as the stamp expert.

Background
The main character of the film is trying to remember the tune of a Rita Pavone song throughout the film. The song, "Il Ballo del Mattone", plays as the end credits run.

Distribution
The film opened wide in Argentina on August 31, 2000. The film was screened at various film festivals, including: the Telluride Film Festival, United States; the Toronto International Film Festival, Canada; the Medellín de Película, Colombia; the Portland International Film Festival, United States; the Cognac Festival du Film Policier, France; the München Fantasy Filmfest, Germany; the Norwegian International Film Festival, Norway; and others.

In the United States it opened on a limited basis on April 19, 2002.

Remakes
The film's screenplay was adapted for the 2004 American film Criminal. It was also used as a basis for three Indian films: the Bollywood film Bluffmaster! (2005), the Malayalam film Gulumal (2009) and the Telugu film All the Best (2012).

Critical reception
Nine Queens garnered mostly positive reviews from film critics. On review aggregator website Rotten Tomatoes, the film holds a 92% approval rating based on 95 reviews, with an average rating of 7.45/10. The site's consensus reads: "Deliciously twist-filled, Nine Queens is a clever and satisfying crime caper." On Metacritic, the film has a weighted average score of 80/100 based on 30 reviews, indicating "generally favorable reviews".

Roger Ebert, in his review of Nine Queens for the Chicago Sun-Times, gave the film a score of three out of four stars, commending its screenplay and calling the film "an elegant and sly deadpan comedy." Michael Wilmington of the Chicago Tribune awarded the film three-and-a-half out of four stars, and called it "One of the most clever, most enjoyable thrillers in years." Orlando Sentinel film critic Roger Moore gave the film four stars out of five, writing, "the laughs are dark, the puzzle steadily more engrossing and the surprises, just like Heist, are doozies, up to the finale." Edward Guthmann of the San Francisco Chronicle also gave the film a positive review, writing: "Fast-paced and unerringly surprising, Nine Queens is nicely performed by a large cast [...] David Mamet plowed this con-the-con turf in Heist, House of Games and The Spanish Prisoner, but Bielinsky, in his directing debut, makes it seem sassy and reinvented."

Geoff Pevere of The Toronto Star wrote in his review of the film: "If Nine Queens draws you on a journey that eventually leads up a garden path toward your own suckerhood, it's all the more pleasurable for having done so with such slick expertise." BBC film critic Tom Dawson called the film "a welcome addition to the genre" and a "taut thriller a powerful allegorical resonance."

Awards
Wins
 Argentine Film Critics Association Awards: Silver Condor; Best Actor, Ricardo Darín; Best Cinematography, Marcelo Camorino; Best Director, Fabián Bielinsky; Best Editing, Sergio Zottola; Best Film; Best Original Screenplay, Fabián Bielinsky; Best Supporting Actress, Elsa Berenguer; 2001.
 Biarritz International Festival of Latin American Cinema: Best Actor, (tie) Ricardo Darín and Gastón Pauls; for Nueve reinas; 2001.
 Bogotá Film Festival: Audience Award, Fabián Bielinsky; Golden Precolumbian Circle, Best Director, Fabián Bielinsky; 2001.
 Lima Latin American Film Festival: Elcine First Prize, Fabián Bielinsky; 2001.
 Lleida Latin-American Film Festival: Audience Award, Fabián Bielinsky; Best Director, Fabián Bielinsky; 2001.
 Oslo Films from the South Festival: Audience Award, Fabián Bielinsky; 2001.
 Cognac Festival du Film Policier: Grand Prix, Fabián Bielinsky; Premiere Award, Fabián Bielinsky; 2002.
 Fantasporto: Directors' Week Award, Best Screenplay, Fabián Bielinsky; 2002.
 Portland International Film Festival: Audience Award Best First Film, Fabián Bielinsky; 2002.
 Sant Jordi Awards: Best Foreign Actor, Ricardo Darín. Also for La Fuga (2001) and El Hijo de la Novia (2001); 2002.

References

External links
 
 
 
 Nueve reinas at the cinenacional.com 

2000 films
2000 crime drama films
2000s mystery films
Films shot in Buenos Aires
Films set in Buenos Aires
2000s heist films
Argentine independent films
2000s Spanish-language films
Films about con artists
Films distributed by Disney